Phoenix pusilla (pusilla, Latin: tiny or weak), the Ceylon date palm or flour palm, is a species of flowering plant in the palm family, native to southern India and Sri Lanka (formerly Ceylon). They are found in lowlands, ridges and on hills. No taller than 5 m, this species is usually single-stemmed but clumps do occur naturally. At 25 cm in diameter, the trunks are covered with distinct leaf-base scars, forming a 'wicker' pattern. Their distinguishable trunks have made them popular in cultivation. They are drought tolerant and slow-growing.

References

Riffle, Robert L. and Craft, Paul (2003) An Encyclopedia of Cultivated Palms. Portland: Timber Press.  /  (page 403)
http://www.pacsoa.org.au/palms/Phoenix/pusilla.html
Nucleated succession by an endemic palm Phoenix pusilla enhances diversity of woody species in the arid Coromandel Coast of India 
http://www.palmworld.org/palmworld-Phoenix-pusilla.html

pusilla
Flora of India (region)
Flora of Sri Lanka
Plants described in 1788